= Verband Bayerischer Amateurtheater =

Theatre company in Rosenheim, Bavaria, Germany

Coordinates: 47.855°N 12.129°E

Verband Bayerischer Amateurtheater is a theatre company based in Rosenheim, Bavaria, Germany.
